The Forked River Nuclear Power Plant was a proposed nuclear power plant in Lacey Township in Ocean County, New Jersey.  It was proposed as a single 1,070 MW reactor in 1969 to be built by Combustion Engineering and operated by Jersey Central Power and Light. The facility would have been located on a site between JCP&L's existing Oyster Creek Nuclear Generating Station and the Garden State Parkway. Unlike the Oyster Creek Plant, the Forked River Plant would have a cooling tower to prevent the release of hot water into Oyster Creek and Barnegat Bay.

Construction of the plant was halted in 1974 due to financial cut-backs and environmental protests, but was resumed in 1976. The plant's construction was ultimately canceled in 1980, when General Public Utilities (the parent company of JCP&L) halted construction "because of financial difficulties stemming from the accident at its Three Mile Island facility", as well as uncertainty over whether the NRC would grant a license or possibly institute other costly regulations. In addition, community fears and a construction accident that killed one worker helped end the plant's construction.

See also

Oyster Creek Nuclear Generating Station

References

External links
 Cancelled Nuclear Units Ordered in the United States

Buildings and structures in Ocean County, New Jersey
Cancelled nuclear power stations in the United States
Nuclear power plants in New Jersey
FirstEnergy
Lacey Township, New Jersey